The 1995 NCAA Division I Cross Country Championships were the 57th annual NCAA Men's Division I Cross Country Championship and the 15th annual NCAA Women's Division I Cross Country Championship to determine the team and individual national champions of NCAA Division I men's and women's collegiate cross country running in the United States. In all, four different titles were contested: men's and women's individual and team championships.

Held on November 20, 1995, the combined meet was hosted by Iowa State University in Ames, Iowa. The distance for the men's race was 10 kilometers (6.21 miles) while the distance for the women's race was 5 kilometers (3.11 miles). 

The men's team championship was won by Arkansas (100 points), their eighth overall title and first since winning four consecutive titles between 1990 and 1993. The women's team championship was won by Providence (88 points), their first. 

The two individual champions were Godfrey Siamusiye (Arkansas, 30:09) and Kathy Butler (Wisconsin, 16:51).

Men's title
Distance: 10,000 meters

Men's Team Result (Top 10)

Men's Individual Result (Top 10)

Women's title
Distance: 5,000 meters

Women's Team Result (Top 10)

Women's Individual Result (Top 10)

References
 

NCAA Cross Country Championships
NCAA Division I Cross Country Championships
NCAA Division I Cross Country Championships
NCAA Division I Cross Country Championships
Track and field in Iowa
Ames, Iowa
Iowa State University